The 2005–06 National Division Three North was the sixth season (eighteenth overall) of the fourth division (north) of the English domestic rugby union competition using the name National Division Three North.  New teams to the division included Nuneaton who were relegated from the 2004–05 National Division Two while Leicester Lions came up as champions of Midlands Division 1 along with Preston Grasshoppers (champions) and Hull Ionians (playoffs) who were promoted from North Division 1.  The league system was 4 points for a win, 2 points for a draw and additional bonus points being awarded for scoring 4 or more tries and/or losing within 7 points of the victorious team.  In terms of promotion the league champions would go straight up into National Division Two while the runners up would have a one-game playoff against the runners up from National Division Three South (at the home ground of the club with the superior league record) for the final promotion place.

After just missing out on the playoffs last season, Bradford & Bingley went two places better by winning the championship, finishing 13 points clear of runners up Nuneaton to gain promotion to the 2006–07 National Division Two.  Nuneaton would, however, make an instance return to National Division Two after their relegation a season ago, by defeating  2005–06 National Division Three South runners up North Walsham away in the north-south playoff.  There were only two relegation spots this year with the two teams to go down being Kendal and New Brighton.  They  were easily the weakest in the division with 13th placed New Brighton finishing 41 points behind 12th placed Leicester Lions.  Both sides would drop down to North Division 1.

Participating teams and locations

Final league table

Results

Round 1

Round 2

Round 10 (rescheduled game) 

Game brought forward from 26 November 2005.

Round 3

Round 4

Round 5

Round 6

Round 7 

Postponed.  Game rescheduled to 4 February 2006.

Postponed.  Game rescheduled to 4 February 2006.

Postponed.  Game rescheduled to 4 February 2006.

Postponed.  Game rescheduled to 4 February 2006.

Round 8 

Postponed.  Game rescheduled to 29 April 2006.

Round 9 

Postponed.  Game rescheduled to 11 March 2006.

Postponed.  Game rescheduled to 11 March 2006.

Round 10 

Postponed.  Game rescheduled to 15 April 2006.

Game brought forward to 17 September 2005.

Round 11

Round 12

Round 13 

Postponed.  Game rescheduled to 11 March 2006.

Round 14

Round 15

Round 16

Round 17

Round 7 (rescheduled games) 

Game rescheduled from 5 November 2005.

Game rescheduled from 5 November 2005.

Game rescheduled from 5 November 2005.

Game rescheduled from 5 November 2005.

Round 18 

Postponed.  Game rescheduled to 29 April 2006.

Round 19

Round 20

Round 21  

Postponed.  Game rescheduled to 11 March 2006.

Postponed.  Game rescheduled to 11 March 2006.

Game initially postponed but due to fixture congestion and the fact that the result would not affect the final league table the game would ultimately be cancelled.

Postponed.  Game rescheduled to 11 March 2006.

Postponed.  Game rescheduled to 15 April 2006.

Rounds 9, 13 & 21 (rescheduled games) 

Game rescheduled from 4 March 2006.

Game rescheduled from 4 March 2006.

Game rescheduled from 19 November 2005.

Game rescheduled from 19 November 2005.

Game rescheduled from 4 March 2006.

Game rescheduled from 17 December 2005.

Round 22 

Postponed.  Game rescheduled to 6 May 2006.

Round 23 

Game initially postponed but due to fixture congestion and the fact that the result would not affect the final league table the game would ultimately be cancelled.

Round 24 

Postponed.  Game rescheduled to 15 April 2006.

Round 25

Rounds 10, 21 & 24 (rescheduled games) 

Game rescheduled from 26 November 2005.

Game rescheduled from 1 April 2006.

Game rescheduled from 4 March 2006.

Round 26

Rounds 8 & 18 (rescheduled games) 

Game rescheduled from 12 November 2005.

Game rescheduled from 11 February 2006.

Round 22 (rescheduled game) 

Game rescheduled from 18 March 2006.

Promotion play-off
The league runners up of National Division Three South and North would meet in a playoff game for promotion to National Division Two.  North Walsham were the southern division runners up and as they had a superior league record than northern runners-up, Nuneaton, they hosted the play-off match.

Total season attendances

Individual statistics 

 Note that points scorers includes tries as well as conversions, penalties and drop goals.

Top points scorers

Top try scorers

Season records

Team
Largest home win — 74 pts
74 - 0 Nuneaton at home to Kendal on 22 April 2006
Largest away win — 61 pts
68 - 7 Preston Grasshoppers away to New Brighton on 22 October 2005
Most points scored — 90 pts
90 - 21 Bradford & Bingley at home to New Brighton on 18 February 2006
Most tries in a match — 14
Bradford & Bingley at home to New Brighton on 18 February 2006
Most conversions in a match — 10
Bradford & Bingley at home to New Brighton on 18 February 2006
Most penalties in a match — 6
Fylde away to Leicester Lions on 25 February 2006
Most drop goals in a match — 3
Fylde at home to Preston Grasshoppers on 7 January 2006

Player
Most points in a match — 32
 Paul Bailey for Preston Grasshoppers at home to Fylde on 10 September 2005
Most tries in a match — 6
 Mark Kirkby  for Fylde away to Leicester Lions on 25 February 2006
Most conversions in a match — 10
 Tom Rhodes for Bradford & Bingley at home to New Brighton on 18 February 2006
Most penalties in a match — 6
 Mike Scott for Fylde away to Leicester Lions on 25 February 2006
Most drop goals in a match — 3 
 Mike Scott for Fylde at home to Preston Grasshoppers on 7 January 2006

Attendances
Highest — 1,575 
Fylde at home to Preston Grasshoppers on 7 January 2006
Lowest — 50  
Leicester Lions at home to Cleckheaton on 7 January 2006
Highest Average Attendance — 479
Fylde
Lowest Average Attendance — 104
Leicester Lions

See also
 English Rugby Union Leagues
 English rugby union system
 Rugby union in England

References

External links
 NCA Rugby

2005–06
2005–06 in English rugby union leagues